The kittiwakes (genus Rissa) are two closely related seabird species in the gull family Laridae, the black-legged kittiwake (Rissa tridactyla) and the red-legged kittiwake (Rissa brevirostris). The epithets "black-legged" and "red-legged" are used to distinguish the two species in North America, but in Europe, where Rissa brevirostris is not found, the black-legged kittiwake is often known simply as kittiwake, or more colloquially in some areas as tickleass or tickleace. The name is derived from its call, a shrill 'kittee-wa-aaake, kitte-wa-aaake'. The genus name Rissa is from the Icelandic name Rita for the black-legged kittiwake.

Description
The two species are physically very similar. They have a white head and body, grey back, grey wings tipped solid black and a bright yellow bill. Other differences include a shorter bill, larger eyes, a larger, rounder head and darker grey wings in the red-legged kittiwake. While most black-legged kittiwakes do, indeed, have dark-grey legs, some have pinkish-grey to reddish legs, making colouration a somewhat unreliable identifying marker.

In contrast to the dappled chicks of other gull species, kittiwake chicks are downy and white since they are under relatively little threat of predation, as the nests are on extremely steep cliffs. Unlike other gull chicks which wander around as soon as they can walk, kittiwake chicks instinctively sit still in the nest to avoid falling off. Juveniles take three years to reach maturity. When in winter plumage, both birds have a dark grey smudge behind the eye and a grey hind-neck collar. The sexes are visually indistinguishable.

Distribution and habitat
Kittiwakes are coastal breeding birds ranging in the North Pacific, North Atlantic, and Arctic oceans. They form large, dense, noisy colonies during the summer reproductive period, often sharing habitat with murres. They are the only gull species that are exclusively cliff-nesting. A colony of kittiwakes living in Newcastle upon Tyne and Gateshead in the north east of England has made homes on both the Tyne Bridge and Baltic Centre for Contemporary Art. This colony is notable because it is the furthest inland colony of kittiwakes in the world.

Species

Photo gallery

References

External links

Kittiwakes
Taxa named by James Francis Stephens